Rangsit University Stadium is a multi-purpose stadium in  Pathum Thani Province , Thailand.  It is currently used mostly for football matches and is the home stadium of Rangsit University.  The stadium holds 3,000 people.

Football venues in Thailand
Multi-purpose stadiums in Thailand
Buildings and structures in Pathum Thani province
Sport in Pathum Thani province